Abell 2147 is a galaxy cluster in the Abell catalogue. It is located within the core of the Hercules Superclusters (SCI 160), within Serpens Caput, near the cluster Abell 2152, approximately two degrees south southwest of the Hercules Cluster (Abell 2151). It is possible that Abell 2147 is actually part of the Hercules Cluster considering that it shares the same redshift of 550 million light years.

This galaxy cluster contains mostly faint, small and scattered galaxies.

See also
 Abell catalogue
 List of Abell clusters
 X-ray astronomy

References

External links
 Image
 Numerous images from the Chandra X-ray Observatory
 Image showing location relative to other Abell clusters

2147
Galaxy clusters
Virgo (constellation)
Abell richness class 1
Hercules Superclusters